Badr is a satellite city in the Eastern Area of Cairo, Egypt. It was planned and is administered by the New Urban Communities Authority(NUCA). Badr was established in 1982 according to Prime Ministerial Decree 235/1982 allocating NUCA 3000 acres in the Eastern Desert on the Cairo-Suez Highway. It has since grown to 21,000 acres, and has a 2200 acre industrial zone that includes 564 factories, in addition to this, 501 factories are still under construction. Most factories are built with the aim of exporting to Arab, African and world markets. In 2017, the census recorded 31,299 residents.

Description
It is the nearest industrial city to Cairo International Airport, Suez Port, it is also close to the Delta and the Suez Canal.
 
Projects in Badr are exempted from taxes for up to 10 years from the date at which their operation commenced.

Education
The city houses three universities, namely the Egyptian-Russian University, Future University in Egypt، the Egyptian E-Learning University and Badr University in Cairo BUC.

Health care 
The city has a central national hospital, Badr Hospital. The hospital was founded in the early 2005 and started working in 2009. Badr Hospital is owned by Helwan University and is now assigned to be a University Hospital.

Climate
Badr City essentially has a hot desert climate. The climate is generally extremely dry all over the year except some sporadic rain during the winter months. In addition to rarity of rain, extreme heat during summer months is also a general climate feature of Badr although daytime temperatures are milder during autumn and winter.
The Köppen-Geiger climate classification system classifies its climate as a hot desert (BWh), as the rest of Egypt.

See also

 New Urban Communities Authority
 Shorouk City
 New Cairo
 Satellite city

References

Cities in Egypt
Populated places in Cairo Governorate
New towns in Egypt